My Old Dutch is a 1934 British drama film directed by Sinclair Hill and starring Betty Balfour, Gordon Harker, Michael Hogan and Florrie Forde. The film portrays the lives of Londoners during the First World War. The film was made at Islington Studios by Gainsborough Pictures. The film's sets were designed by Peter Proud. Bryan Edgar Wallace contributed to the screenplay, adapted from the stage play written by Arthur Shirley and also based on Albert Chevalier's famous song.

Synopsis
This film tracks the highlights of a cockney couple's son as he marries a rich man's disowned daughter and dies in the RFC.

Cast
 Betty Balfour as Lil
 Gordon Harker as Ernie
 Michael Hogan as Bert
 Florrie Forde as Aunt Bertha
 Mickey Brantford as Jim
 Glennis Lorimer as Valerie Paraday
 Peter Gawthorne as Mr Paraday
 Frank Pettingell as Uncle Alf
 Robert Nainby as Grandpa
 Bill Shine (actor) as Cousin 'arry
 Finlay Currie as Mo
 Felix Aylmer as Judge
 John Singer as Jim as a child
 Ronald Shiner

References

Bibliography
 Low, Rachael. Filmmaking in 1930s Britain. George Allen & Unwin, 1985.
 Wood, Linda. British Films, 1927-1939. British Film Institute, 1986.

External links
 
 
 

1934 films
British black-and-white films
Films directed by Sinclair Hill
Gainsborough Pictures films
British World War I films
Films set in London
Islington Studios films
Films set in the 1890s
Films set in the 1900s
Films set in the 1910s
Films set in the 1920s
British historical drama films
1930s historical drama films
Films scored by Jack Beaver
1934 drama films
1930s English-language films
1930s British films